Verband der Berufsringer was a German independent professional wrestling promotion founded in 1912. It is the oldest known wrestling promotion in the world.

History

See also

 List of professional wrestling promotions in Europe

References

External links

German professional wrestling promotions
Entertainment companies established in 1912
1912 establishments in Germany
Companies based in Berlin
Sport in Berlin